Communal apartments (colloquial: kommunalka) appeared in the Soviet Union following the October Revolution of 1917. The term is a product of the Soviet epoch. The concept of communal apartments grew in Russia and the Soviet Union as a response to a housing crisis in urban areas; authorities presented them as the product of the "new collective vision of the future."

Between two and seven families typically shared a communal apartment. Each family typically had only one room, which usually served as a living room, dining room, and bedroom for the entire family. All the residents of the building shared the use of the hallways, kitchen (commonly known as the "communal kitchen"), bathroom and (rarely) telephone.

The communal apartment became the predominant form of housing in the Soviet Union for generations, and examples still exist in "the most fashionable central districts of large Russian cities". Most communal apartments were replaced after the death of Joseph Stalin with Khrushchyovkas in which each family had their own private apartment. This was then followed by Brezhnevkas which were built taller, had bigger apartments, and came with heretofore unavailable amenities such as elevators, interior bathrooms, garbage disposals and central heating systems. Today in Russia, Soviet style apartment blocks are still built and are termed "Novostroika", they are often painted colorfully and have all modern amenities.

History

Rise

The first communal apartments appeared in the early 18th century, when rental lodging was partitioned by the landlords into "corners", often walk-through tiny dwellings. From the mid-19th century the number of such apartments had drastically increased. Usually they consisted of 3 to 6 rooms.
In the 20th century, the Soviet Union undertook “intensive industrialization and urbanization,” shifting from eighty percent of the population living in rural villages and towns at the time of the Revolution, to nearly the same percentage living in cities by the 1990s. People were driven from the countryside by poverty and collectivization, and pulled to the city by the industrialization of the economy. This exodus put enormous pressure on existing urban housing accommodations. Communal apartments were one answer to the housing crisis, and many considered them a step up from the alternatives of housing communes, hostels, and barracks.
   
Lenin conceived of the communal apartment, and drafted a plan to “expropriate and resettle private apartments” shortly after the October Revolution. His plan inspired many architects to begin communal housing projects, to create a “revolutionary topography.” The communal apartment was revolutionary by “uniting different social groups in one physical space.”  Furthermore, housing belonged to the government and families were allotted an extremely small number of square meters each.

Fall

After Stalin's death in 1953, Khrushchev's regime “embarked upon a mass housing campaign,” to eliminate the persistent housing shortages, and create private apartments for urban residents. This campaign was a response to popular demand for “better living conditions, single-family housing, and greater privacy;” Khrushchev believed that granting the people private apartments would give them greater enthusiasm for the communist system in place and that improving people's attitudes and living conditions would lead to a healthier and more productive workforce. However, the new apartments were built quickly, with an emphasis on quantity over quality, and in underdeveloped neighborhoods, with poor systems of public transportation, making daily life harder for workers. These apartment blocks quickly became called ‘khrushchyoba,’ a cross between Khrushchev's name and the Russian term for slums.

Life

Layout

Space in communal apartments was divided into common spaces and private rooms “mathematically or bureaucratically,” with little to no attention paid to the physical space of the existing structures. Most apartments were partitioned in a dysfunctional manner, creating “strange spaces, long corridors, and so-called black entrances through labyrinthine inner courtyards.” Entire families lived in a single overcrowded room, with little hope of changing their situation.
   
Residents were meant to share the kitchen, bathroom and corridors  amongst themselves, but even these spaces could be divided. For example, each family might have their own kitchen table, gas burner, doorbell, and even light switch, preferring to walk down the hall to use their light switch to turn on the bathroom lights rather than using a closer switch belonging to another resident. Furthermore, the hallways were often poorly lit, because each family had control of one of the lights hanging in the corridor, and would only turn it on for their own benefit. Though communal apartments were relatively small, residents had to wait at times to use the bathroom or kitchen sink. The kitchen was the primary place the residents interacted with one another and scheduled shared responsibilities. Wary of theft, residents rarely left groceries in the kitchen unless they put locks on the kitchen cabinets. However, they often stored their toiletries in the kitchen as opposed to the bathroom, because other residents could more easily use things left unattended in the bathroom. Laundry was left to dry in both the kitchen and the bathroom.

Dynamics

The communal apartment was the only living accommodation in the Soviet Union where the residents had “no particular reason to be living together.” Other forms of communal living were based around type of work or other commonalities, but the communal apartment residents were placed together at random, as a result of the distribution of scarce living space by a governing body. These residents had little commitment to communal living or to each other. In spite of the haphazard nature of their cohabitation, residents had to navigate communal living, which required shared responsibilities and reliance on one another.  Duty schedules were posted in the kitchen or corridors, typically assigning one family to be “on duty” at any given moment. The family on duty would be responsible for cleaning the common spaces by sweeping and mopping the kitchen every few days, cleaning the bathroom and taking out the trash. The length of time a family was scheduled to work usually depended on the size of the family, and the rotation followed the order of the rooms in the apartment.
   
Communal living posed unique challenges; one author tells of an incident when a drunk neighbor passed out on the floor in front of the entrance to their room and urinated, to the horror of her mother, who was entertaining foreign guests when the “little yellow stream slowly made its way through the door of the room.” She relates this incident to the experience of communal living, “both intimate and public, with a mixture of ease and fear in the presence of foreigners and neighbors.”  Tenants in communal apartments are “like family in some respects and like strangers in others.” Neighbors were forced to interact with each other, and they knew nearly everything about each other, their schedules and daily routines, profession, habits, relationships and opinions, prohibiting any sense of privacy in the communal apartment.

The communal kitchen was an epicenter of the communal life in the apartment, with its news and gossips, joys and dramas, friendly shared salt and nasty practical jokes.
   
Spying was especially prevalent in the communal apartment, because of the extremely close quarters people lived in. It was not unusual for a neighbor to look or listen into another resident's room or the common room and to gossip about others. Furthermore, the communal apartment was “a breeding ground of police informants,”  people were encouraged to denounce their neighbors, and often did so to ensure safety for themselves or to gain their neighbor's room for themselves after they had them evicted or imprisoned.
   
Some individuals chose to get married simply to upgrade to a bigger apartment.
   
One way that families were able to improve their living conditions was to “exchange” their living quarters. If a family was separated by divorce they could trade spaces, for example one could swap out one large space for 2 smaller units to accommodate a family. 
   
In spite of all these challenges, many former residents of communal apartments look back fondly on the sense of family they had with their neighbors. When asked which she would prefer, one woman who lived her whole life in a communal apartment in St. Petersburg said

References

External links
 Communal Living in Russia: A Virtual Museum of Soviet Everyday Life

Soviet culture
Apartment types